Potito Starace and Adrian Ungur were the defending champions, but Starace did not participate this year. Ungur plays alongside Flavio Cipolla, but lost in the first round to Andrej Martin and Igor Zelenay.

Martin and Zelenay won the tournament, defeating Dino Marcan and Antonio Šančić in the final.

Seeds

Draw

References
 Main Draw

Internazionali di Tennis del Friuli Venezia Giulia - Doubles
2015 Doubles
Friuli